Mayorov, or Mayorova (feminine; Майорова), is a common Russian surname. It is derived from the sobriquet "майор" (literally mean "major"), which may refer to:

 Alexander Mayorov (born 1957), Soviet Nordic combined skier
 Boris Mayorov (born 1938), Soviet hockey player
 Henrich Mayorov (1936-2022), Russian-Ukrainian ballet dancer
 Lev Mayorov (1969-2020), Azerbaijani football player
 Maxim Mayorov (born 1989), Russian born professional ice hockey player
 Yevgeni Mayorov (1938–1997), Soviet hockey player
 Vitaly Maiorov (1961–1997), Lithuanian chess master
 Albina Mayorova (born 1977), Russian long-distance runner
 Elena Mayorova (1958–1997), Soviet film and stage actress

See also 
Mayor

Russian-language surnames